Pyrgocythara mighelsi is a species of sea snail, a marine gastropod mollusk in the family Mangeliidae.

Description
The length of the shell attains 6 mm.

Distribution
This species occurs in the demersal zone of the Pacific Ocean off Hawaii, Taiwan and New Caledonia.

References

  Tucker, J.K. 2004 Catalog of recent and fossil turrids (Mollusca: Gastropoda). Zootaxa 682:1–1295
 Kilburn R.N., Fedosov A. & Kantor Yu.I. (2014) The shallow-water New Caledonia Drilliidae of genus Clavus Montfort, 1810 (Mollusca: Gastropoda: Conoidea). Zootaxa 3818(1): 1–69.
 Chen, W. D. & Li, Y. J. 2007. Heng chun ban dao de mi ni bei ji xiao xing bei lei = Mini-shells and small shells of Hengchun Peninsula, Taiwan

External links

mighelsi